Ilha dos Lobos is a small island and wildlife refuge on the Atlantic coast of Torres, Rio Grande do Sul, Brazil.

Location 

It is named after the sea lions (grandes lobos marinhos) who use the island for breeding between July and November.
It has caused many shipwrecks in storms, including the Hawaii (1965).
The island is a resting point for seals migrating from Patagonia, and is a transit point for dolphins, whales, porpoises, sea turtles and birds.

Conservation

This was revoked and the island was reclassified as a wildlife refuge on 4 July 2005, the Refúgio de vida silvestre Ilha dos Lobos. 
The reserve was created to protect and monitor marine species, for research and environmental education.
Fishing or landing on the reserve is prohibited.

Recreational use

The island has started to attract surfers, who come by boat.
They have found it is a giant point break with proper conditions for Tow-in surfing. Much of the effort to establish Ilha dos Lobos as an international class tow-in surf spot is credited to Torres Local Surf hero Zeca Scheffer, who died in a car crash in Dec 2006.
Surfing in this island is banned because of its conservation status by national laws.
Although proper conditions are rare it is possible to dive around the island.

References

Sources

Lobos
Landforms of Rio Grande do Sul
Protected areas of Rio Grande do Sul
Wildlife refuges of Brazil